Whompyjawed is the debut novel by American author Mitch Cullin. It is the first installment of the writer's Texas Trilogy that also includes the dark novel-in-verse Branches and the surrealistic novel Tideland.

Whompyjawed was first published in September 1999 as a hardcover edition from The Permanent Press.  A trade paperback edition was published by Simon & Schuster in April 2001, but as of 2007, it is no longer in print.

1999 American novels
Novels by Mitch Cullin
Native American novels
Novels set in Texas
Texas Trilogy
American bildungsromans
1999 debut novels
Permanent Press (publisher) books